Viktor Reinhold Smeds (18 September 1885 – 22 February 1957) was a Finnish sportsleader and a boxer, who also won an Olympic bronze in gymnastics.

Sport 

He was one of the most significant and internationally best-known sports leaders of his generation in Finland. His impact was especially pivotal in boxing. He also developed strength sports and wrestling, and won an Olympic medal in gymnastics.

Olympics 

He was the leader of the Finnish Olympic boxing team in 1932 and 1936.

He was a wrestling judge at the 1920, 1924 and 1928 games, and a jury chairman in 
1936 and 1948. He was a boxing judge at the 1928 and 1932 games and a jury chairman in 1948. He oversaw the boxing events at the 1952 games.

He sat in the board of the Finnish Olympic Committee in 1932–1953.

Other sport 

He represented Finland in Nordic students' rowing competition twice. His team placed 3rd in 1907, and 1st in 1908.

He won the Finnish championship in boxing in light heavyweight in 1923 and heavyweight in 1925. He also wrote some boxing-related guides.

He also played football and tennis.

Club memberships:
 Lovisa Tor, founder and chairman
 Helsingin Nyrkkeilyseura, founder and chairman
 Helsingin Atleettiklubi, chairman

Sports leader 

International:
 International Federation of Associated Wrestling Styles, president in 1929–1952, honorary president
 International Federation of Amateur Boxers / Amateur International Boxing Association, vice president in 1938–1950 
 Associazione Pugilistica Professionistica Europea, board member

He founded the Finnish Boxing Federation in 1923. He was the president of the federation until his death, except for one year-long break.

He also was the chairman of the wrestling chapter of Finnish Gymnastics and Sports Federation in 1921–1922.

Career 

Smeds completed his matriculation exam in Vaasa Swedish Lycaeum in 1904, and graduated as a filosofian kandidaatti (roughly Master of Arts) from the University of Helsinki in 1907.

He moved to Loviisa to teach Russian, gymnastics and physical education in 1909. He was also the local police chief.

He was a businessman in various companies first in Saint Petersburg in 1916–1918 and then in Helsinki from 1918. He started his own business in 1940.

He was a recruiter for the Finnish volunteers in the Waffen-SS. He also interrogated Soviet prisoners of war in Finland. He left for Sweden in Operation Stella Polaris but soon returned to Finland.

He spoke about twelve languages.

Accolades 

He received the following official decorations:
 Finnish state decorations:
 Medal of Liberty, 1st Class
 Commander of the Order of the Lion of Finland
 Commemorative medal of the Winter War
 foreign national orders:
 Commander of the Order of Vasa (Sweden)
 Knight of the Legion of Honour (France)
 Fourth Class of the Order of the White Star (Estonia)
 awards of sports:
 Grand Cross of Merit of Finnish physical education and sports
 Cross of Merit, 1st Class, of the Finnish Olympic Games 1952
 German Olympic Decoration, 1st Class
 Medaille d'honneur de l'Education Physique (France)

Family 

His parents were farmer Johan Erik Smeds and Lovisa Båsk.

His first wife was Aina Maria Niska, sister of Algoth Niska, married in 1910. They had two children:
 Tove Maria, born 1912
 Björn, 1915–1952

His second wife was Helena Somow, married 1927. His third wife was Greta Carlson, married 1952.

He's buried at the Hietaniemi Cemetery.

Sources

References

1885 births
1957 deaths
Finnish male artistic gymnasts
Gymnasts at the 1908 Summer Olympics
Olympic gymnasts of Finland
Olympic bronze medalists for Finland
Olympic medalists in gymnastics
Medalists at the 1908 Summer Olympics